Veregin station is a railway station in Veregin, Saskatchewan, Canada. It serves as a flag stop for Via Rail's Winnipeg–Churchill train.

Footnotes

External links 
Via Rail Station Information

Via Rail stations in Saskatchewan